Andreas Blomqvist (born 5 May 1992) is a Swedish footballer who plays for the Swedish football club Mjällby AIF as a midfielder.

References

External links

1992 births
Living people
Association football midfielders
Swedish footballers
Sweden under-21 international footballers
Sweden international footballers
Swedish expatriate footballers
Allsvenskan players
Mjällby AIF players
AaB Fodbold players
Danish Superliga players
Expatriate men's footballers in Denmark
IFK Norrköping players
People from Sölvesborg Municipality
Sportspeople from Blekinge County